Ulrich Erfurth (1910–1986) was a German film director.

Filmography
Director
  (1944/1950)
 Finale (1948)
 Not Afraid of Big Animals (1953)
 Columbus Discovers Kraehwinkel (1954)
 Captain Wronski (1954)
 One Woman Is Not Enough? (1955)
 Ripening Youth (1955) — based on Die Reifeprüfung by Max Dreyer
 Fruit Without Love (1956)
 Melody of the Heath (1956)
 Three Birch Trees on the Heath (1956)
 Minna von Barnhelm (1957, TV film) — based on Minna von Barnhelm by Gotthold Ephraim Lessing
 Helden (1957, TV film) — based on Arms and the Man by George Bernard Shaw
 Colombe (1958, TV film) — based on Colombe by Jean Anouilh
 Die sechste Frau (1959, TV film) — based on Die sechste Frau by 
 Heaven, Love and Twine (1960)
 My Husband, the Economic Miracle (1961)
 Der Hochtourist (1961) — based on Der Hochtourist by Max Neal and Curt Kraatz
 Die Banditen (1962, TV film) — based on the operetta Les brigands
 Der tolle Tag (1962, TV film) — based on The Marriage of Figaro by Pierre Beaumarchais
 Das Leben ein Traum (1963, TV film) — based on Life Is a Dream by Pedro Calderón de la Barca
 Signor Rizzi kommt zurück (1963, TV film) — based on Mr. Rizzi's Return by Anthony Spinner
 Die Dubarry (1963, TV film) — based on the operetta Gräfin Dubarry
  (1964, TV series, 4 episodes)
 Die Reise auf den Mond (1964, TV film) — based on the operetta Le voyage dans la lune
 Der Apoll von Bellac (1964, TV film) — based on The Apollo of Bellac by Jean Giraudoux
 Die Sakramentskarosse (1965, TV film) — based on Le Carrosse du Saint-Sacrement by Prosper Mérimée
 Die Troerinnen (1966, TV film) — based on The Trojan Women by Euripides, adapted by Jean-Paul Sartre
 König Lear (1967, TV film) — based on King Lear by William Shakespeare
 Cäsar und Cleopatra (1969, TV film) — based on Caesar and Cleopatra by George Bernard Shaw
 Maestro der Revolution? (1971, TV film)
Actor
 Second Hand Destiny (1949)
 Immobilien (1973, TV film)
 Die Kur (1978, TV series)

References

Bibliography
 Giesen, Rolf. Nazi Propaganda Films: A History and Filmography. McFarland & Company, 2003.

External links

1910 births
1986 deaths
Mass media people  from Wuppertal